Four historic sites within the Holy Trinity Cemetery near Strasburg, North Dakota, United States, identified as Holy Trinity Cemetery, Wrought-Iron Cross Site A, as Holy Trinity Cemetery, Wrought-Iron Cross Site B, and likewise for Site C and Site D, were listed on the National Register of Historic Places in 1989. They include wrought-iron crosses. The listing for Site A included 9 contributing objects and work by Deport Schneider and Jake Schneider.  The listing for Site B included 3 contributing objects and work by Simon Marquardt and Michael Schmidt.  Site C included just one contributing object, dating from 1912.  Site D included just one.

Tibertius ("Deport") Schneider (1877–1941), of Emmons County, Simon Marquardt, of Zeeland and Michael Schmidt, of Hague, were among a number of "German-Russian blacksmiths in central North Dakota" who developed individual styles in their crosses and whose "work was known for miles around them."

References

Cemeteries on the National Register of Historic Places in North Dakota
Cemeteries in Emmons County, North Dakota
German-Russian culture in North Dakota
National Register of Historic Places in Emmons County, North Dakota
1912 establishments in North Dakota